The TDF–OLA joint offensive was a series of military battles starting in late October 2021 opposing a coalition of the Tigray Defense Forces (TDF) and Oromo Liberation Army (OLA) against the Ethiopian National Defense Forces (ENDF) in the context of the Tigray War and the OLA insurgency. The TDF and OLA took control of several towns south of Tigray Region in the direction of the Ethiopian capital Addis Ababa in late October and early November. Claims of war crimes included that of the TDF extrajudicially executing 100 youths in Kombolcha, according to federal authorities.

Background

The Tigray War started with the 4 November 2020 Northern Command attacks by Tigray Special Forces against the Ethiopian National Defense Force (ENDF) Northern Command, and continued with the ENDF, Amhara Region special forces and Eritrean Defence Forces (EDF) fighting against Tigrayan forces. All forces carried out numerous war crimes in addition to military battles. By early October 2021, the TDF had regained control of much of Tigray Region and parts of Amhara Region, while the Ethiopian federal authorities maintained a blockade against humanitarian aid to Tigray Region, which Mark Lowcock, former head of the United Nations Office for the Coordination of Humanitarian Affairs (OCHA), viewed as a deliberate aim of "starv[ing] the population either into subjugation or out of existence". In mid-October, the ENDF launched a new military offensive against the TDF, aiming to retake control of Tigray Region and the TDF-controlled parts of Amhara Region.

By 1 November 2021, the long-running Oromo conflict had led to the Oromo Liberation Army (OLA) claiming to have taken military control of "several towns in western, central, and southern Oromia".

Fall of Dessie and Kombolcha
In the few days leading to 2 November, the TDF took control of Dessie and Kombolcha. The New York Times (NYT) saw the event as strategically significant, describing the two towns as being "strategically located ... on a highway running from north to south that has become the spine of a war that could determine the future of Ethiopia."

OLA claimed to have taken control of Kamisee on 31 October. The TDF and OLA confirmed a military alliance against the federal forces. The military actions of the TDF-OLA coalition were seen by the federal authorities as a threat to Addis Ababa, the capital of Ethiopia. On 5 November, the TDF and OLA announced a wider coalition, including seven smaller groups, that they named the United Front of Ethiopian Federalist and Confederalist Forces.

The EDF, which had strongly supported the ENDF in earlier phases of the Tigray War, appeared to be absent from late October/early November fighting. According to French historian and Horn of Africa expert Gérard Prunier, this is because the bulk of the Eritrean army in Tigray was defending the border with Sudan (to prevent Tigrayan rebels from potentially being supplied by Egypt, an opponent to Abiy Ahmed's government) and protecting Eritrea's own border with Tigray, thus leaving the defense of Addis Ababa down mostly to Amhara militias in the face of heavy losses sustained by Ethiopia's federal army. The ENDF command and control structure was described as having "collapsed" by Tigrayan and Western officials.

Mid-late November
On 16 November, the TDF claimed to have taken control of Ataye and Senbete in Oromia Zone in Amhara Region. This area had been the site of clashes between ethnic Oromos and Amharas in the previous months. On 19 November, the rebels were trying to take control of Shewa Robit, and claimed control on 22 November. On 25 November, the TDF was approaching Debre Sina and federal prime minister Abiy Ahmed announced that he would travel to the battlefront. He arrived at an unstated location on the battlefront on 23 November according to a spokesperson. The rebels aimed to cut off a supply line to Djibouti.

By 28 November, Afar Special Forces regained control of Chifra. There were "dead bodies everywhere in the streets" and shops and mosques were destroyed. Residents fled and Chifra became a base for the Afar forces.

According to Sveriges Radio, by late November, OLA had "surrounded" Addis Ababa from the west, south and south-east, and was in coalition with the TDF in the north-east.

December: The Ethiopian Government counter offensive
PM Abiy Ahmed announced that he is joining the war, to lead from the front line, to defend the nation. Since then, ENDF gained major territorial gains including liberation of Dessie and Kombolcha from TPLF forces. On December 13, the Ethiopian government claimed their forces have controlled the main road from Woldia to Mekelle, while TPLF forces are still in control of Woldia. On December 18, ENDF announced that they have liberated Woldia from TPLF forces. On the next day, December 19, deputy prime minister of Ethiopia Demeke Mekonnen visited the tourist attraction city of Lalibela, disproving TPLF's claim that they have controlled Lalibela town. On December 20, Getachew Reda, spokesman of the TPLF announced they were withdrawing from several areas of northern Ethiopia including Amhara and Afar and retreating to Tigray, saying: "We decided to withdraw from these areas to Tigray. We want to open the door to humanitarian aid."

War crimes

The Ethiopian authorities stated that the TDF had extrajudicially killed 100 youths in Kombolcha.

Predictions

In late November 2021, a group of 34 non-governmental organizations and 31 individuals, calling themselves African Citizens; Helen Clark (British politician), Michael Lapsley and David Alton; and Genocide Watch predicted that a genocide, in which Tigrayan and Oromo internees and Amharas are massacred, could result from the offensive. African Citizens saw the threat to take over Addis Ababa as a likely trigger for a genocide.

References

2021 in Ethiopia
2021 military operations
Ethiopian civil conflict (2018–present)
November 2021 events
October 2021 events in Africa